Newbridge Greyhound Stadium is a greyhound racing track located northwest of Newbridge, County Kildare, Ireland.

Racing takes place every Friday evening and the facilities include the grandstand Masters Restaurant and Barkers Bar which offers ample seating.

Race distances are 325, 525, 550, 575 and 750 yards and the feature competitions are the Unraced Bitch Stake, the Juvenile Derby and the Newbridge Oaks.

History 
Following the closure of the old Newbridge greyhound track around St Conleth's Park in 1968 the operation was relocated to a more rural location north of the town near the Rickardstown/Cornelscourt area.
It was still, however, within easy reach of the town and racing would originally take place every Monday and Friday. The new circuit was constructed in 1972, and the management brought the long-running Cox Cup with them. Named after the stadium landlords the Cox family (PJ Cox and sons Dermot and David). The new circuit tended to be a fast track with a large circumference of 520 yards. The new facilities included a glass-enclosed bar which allowed patrons to view not only the racing but the kennels and weighing room as well.
During 1978 further changes were made with a facelift for the main stand; this was the same year that long-standing racing manager Denis Brennan gave up the racing manager's seat that was then taken by Christy Connolly.

The Cox Cup allowed the Newbridge public to view some of the sport's fastest greyhounds, including Ardfert Mick, who broke the track record during the 1991 event. Despite the track facing financial problems at various times, there were more track improvements in 2002, which provided a welcome rejuvenation. On 26 March 2011 the Cox family and the Newbridge Greyhound Racing Company called it a day and decided to close following a downturn in the economic climate. The management stated there has been a reduction in attendances, sponsorship and secondary business activity. The Cox Cup was held from 1964 to 2018.

Following a five month closure it re-opened in August 2011 under the Morgan & Franklin Consortium headed by Managing Director David Morgan who provided renewed investment. Morgan had worked at a senior level with Irish Greyhound Board (IGB) in the past and was also the stadium director for Semple Stadium. The consortium included Peter Franklin, former head of marketing of the IGB and was called Morwell Racing Ltd. However, problems persisted at the track and in March 2013 Morwell Racing Ltd ceased racing.

Welcome news arrived shortly afterwards in 2013 when the IGB stepped in, this time led by the IGB's Philip Peake, and took control of the venue. The track recommenced racing once again on Friday and Saturday nights. Following the COVID-19 pandemic the track was forced into temporary closure but re-opened later, although racing is currently held on Friday evenings only.

Former Competitions
Cox Cup

Track records
Current

Former

References

Greyhound racing venues in the Republic of Ireland
Sport in County Kildare
Sports venues in County Kildare